John Bligh Suttor (23 September 1883 – 11 September 1960) was an Australian politician.

He was born in Waverley to Emma Isabel Hunt and John Bligh Suttor, a pastoralist and businessman. He was the grandson of son of colonial politician John Bligh Suttor. He attended Sydney High School and became an electrical engineer, also owning land near Bathurst. On 19 September 1908 he married Madeline Constance Nash, with whom he had one son.

He was appointed to the New South Wales Legislative Council in 1921 as a Labor Party nominee, although there were allegations that he was not a true member of the party at the time. He served until 1934, when the Council was reconstituted. Suttor died at Wahroonga in 1960.

References

1883 births
1960 deaths
Australian Labor Party members of the Parliament of New South Wales
Members of the New South Wales Legislative Council
20th-century Australian politicians